The  is a professional golf tournament on the Japan Golf Tour. Founded as the Sapporo Open, it has been sponsored by All Nippon Airways since 1973, initially as the ANA Sapporo Open. It is usually held in September each year at the Sapporo Golf Club in Kitahiroshima, Hokkaido.

Sapporo's Wattsu and Yuni courses have both played host to the tournament. The tournament scoring record is 268 (20 under par), set by Masashi Ozaki in 1994. Ozaki also holds the all-time record of wins at the tournament with eight. The 2021 purse was ¥110,000,000, of which the winner's share was ¥20,000,000.

Winners

References

External links
Coverage on Japan Golf Tour's official site
Winners of the ANA Open from official home page 

Japan Golf Tour events
Golf tournaments in Japan
Sport in Hokkaido
Recurring sporting events established in 1972
1972 establishments in Japan